The Kerala State Film Award for Second Best Actor was an award presented annually from 1969 to 2014 at the Kerala State Film Awards of India. The Kerala State Film Awards is managed by the Kerala State Chalachitra Academy, an autonomous non-profit institution working under the Department of Cultural Affairs, Government of Kerala. Rahman is the youngest recipient at age 16 for Koodevide (1983). The award was discontinued in 2014 and was succeeded by the Kerala State Film Award for Best Character Actor from 2015 onwards.

Superlatives

Winners

See also
 Kerala State Film Award for Best Character Actor

References

External links
Official website
PRD, Govt. of Kerala: Awardees List

Kerala State Film Awards